Tebenna agalmatopa is a moth of the family Choreutidae. It is known from Sumatra.

References

Moths described in 1926
Tebenna